Meili Xue Shan (Chinese:梅里雪山, translation: "Mainri snowy range") or Mainri Snow Mountains (Tibetan: སྨན་རི།) is a mountain range in the Chinese province of Yunnan. It lies close to the northwestern boundary of the province and is bounded by the Salween River on the west and the Mekong on the east. The Meili are subrange of the larger Nu Mountains, themselves a constituent range of the Hengduan group.

The crest of the range rises to over 6,000 metres (20,000 ft) above sea level, making for impressive prominence over the river valleys to the east and west, which are between 1,500 metres (4,900 ft) and 1,900 metres (6,200 ft) in elevation. The highest peak is Kawagarbo, which rises to 6,740 metres (22,110 ft). Kawagarbo is considered sacred for Tibetan Buddhists. Other significant peaks include Mianzimu, Cogar Laka and Jiariren-an. Because of restrictions and dangerous conditions, none of the major peaks in the range have ever been summited.

Name 
In Tibet, people usually call the mountain by its peak Kawagarbo or Taizi(Prince) Snow Mountain.

In Tibetan, "Meili/Mainri" means mountains of herbs. People named the mountain "Meili/Mainri" because of the valuable herbs on this mountain.

Main Peaks 

Meili Snow mountain has 13 main peaks. They are also called "Taizi(Prince) Thirteen Peaks".
 Kawagarbo (6,740m)
 Also called Taizi(Prince) Peak.
 Mianzimu (6,054m)
 Also called God Daughter(Queen)Peak.
 Jiariren-an (5,470.5m)
 Five Budda Peak
 Bujiong SongJie Wuxue (approximately. 6,000m)
 Also called Son Peak.
 Lora Zangui Gonbu (5,229m)
 The main peak of Meili Snow Mountain geographically
 Bawu Bameng (6,000m)
 Paba Niding Jiuzhao (5,880m)
 Mabing Zhala Wangdui (6,365m)
 Nairi Dingka (6,379m)
 Cogar Laka (5,993m)
 Zhala Queni (5,640m)
 Badui (5,157m)
 Zhandui Wuxue(6,400m)

History

Expedition Records 

 1987, from August to September, Joetsu Alpine Club abandoned the expedition due to continuous avalanches. (Height: 5,100m) Direction: Mingyong Glacier
 1988, American Expedition team led by Nicholas Clinch abandon their expedition. (Height: 4,350m) Direction: Mingyong Glacier
 1989, September to November, a joint expedition team of Chinese and Academic Alpine Club of Kyoto University(AACK) was created and made their first attempt. (Height: 5,500m) Direction: Yubeng
 1990, November to 1991 January, the joint expedition team made their second attempt and lost their lives in an avalanche. (Height: 6,470m) Direction: Yubeng
 1991, January, avalanche rescue team led by Chinese Mountaineering Association(CMA) reached C2 camp at 5,300m and abandoned their rescue mission on January 21th due to snow cover.
 1991, April to June, a joint search team of Chinese and Japanese abandoned their search mission due to multiple snow storms and avalanches.
 1996, October to December, a new joint expedition team by Chinese and Japanese challenged again, but remained unsuccessful due to extreme weather. (Height: 5,300) Direction: Yubeng
 2023, January, the team of TikTok user "循环cycle" used a modified Dji drone flied over the top of the mountain and sent back the video of the mountain summit.

The Prohibition of the Expedition 
Kawagarbo(Meili Snow Mountain) is known as the sacred mountain in Tibetan Culture. The local people believe the climbing activities on the mountain is a blasphemy and the accidents that happened in the past is the anger of the gods. Considering from both the perspective of the local culture and the safety of the expedition, the local government has decided to stop climbing activities on Meili Snow Mountain.

 2000, an international meeting was held between the government of Yunnan Province and The Nature Conservancy(TNC). The meeting had made an appeal to prohibit any climbing activities on Kawagarbo.
 2001, a law was passed by local government that no climbing activities is then allowed on Kawagarbo.

Climate

Temperature 
The average temperature in Meili Snow Mountain Area has had a trend of increasing each year since 1990.

The temperature of the area is distributed by the mountain range that splits the area into west and east. The temperature on the North-West side increases the most while the east remains mostly the same across the whole year. The increasing trend of temperature in the Meili Snow Mountain range has a strong correlation with the elevation. At an area higher than 4,000m, the temperature's increasing trend gets larger per meter.

Precipitation 
The precipitation has a huge trend of decreasing each year. Most of the precipitation is in summer while winter has the least.

The monsoon period contributes the most to the annual precipitation. Approximately 67% of the precipitation is in the Monsoon period. Among all the observations since 1990, the precipitation in Spring has decreased by 10% in total. The amount of precipitation also has a strong correlation with the elevation. During the monsoon period, the precipitation decreases as the elevation gets lower on the west side of the mountain range. However, the precipitation raises tremendously on the east side of the mountain where the elevation is below 3,700m.

Climate Change 
Due to the increasing trend of temperature and the decreasing trend of precipitation, the Meili Snow Mountain range is facing a huge challenge that its glacier water resource is getting scarcer annually. Protecting the environment and preventing the area from losing its water resource becomes more important each year. The environmental protection in Meili Snow Mountain could be decisive to its biome system.

References

Mountain ranges of Yunnan
Geography of Dêqên Tibetan Autonomous Prefecture
AAAA-rated tourist attractions
Mountain ranges of Tibet
Dêqên County